The Horizon League is an 11-school collegiate athletic conference in the National Collegiate Athletic Association (NCAA) Division I, whose members are located in and near the Great Lakes region.

The Horizon League founded in 1979 as the Midwestern City Conference. The conference changed its name to Midwestern Collegiate Conference in 1985 and then the Horizon League in 2001. The conference started with a membership of six teams and has fluctuated in size with 24 different schools as members at different times. The League currently has 11 members. Its most recent membership changes occurred on July 1, 2022 with the departure of the University of Illinois Chicago (UIC) to the Missouri Valley Conference.

The Horizon League does not sponsor football.

History

Foundation
In May 1978, DePaul University hosted a meeting with representatives from Bradley, Dayton, Detroit, Illinois State, Loyola–Chicago, Air Force, and Xavier who all agreed in principle that a new athletic conference was needed. Further progress was made through a series of early 1979 meetings in San Francisco, Chicago, and St. Louis that included participation by Butler, Creighton, Marquette, and Oral Roberts. On June 16, 1979, the Midwestern City Conference (nicknamed the MCC or Midwestern City 6) was formed by charter members Butler, Evansville, Loyola, Oklahoma City, Oral Roberts, and Xavier, with Detroit joining the following year. As of 2022, Detroit, now known as Detroit Mercy following a merger with Mercy College of Detroit in 1990, is the only remaining member from the league's early history.

Maturity
In 1980 the league established its headquarters in Champaign, Illinois.  The MCC gained an automatic bid to the NCAA Division I men's basketball tournament in 1981, followed by the announcement that Saint Louis University would be joining the following season.  The University of Notre Dame joined the conference for all sports except basketball and football in 1982.  The conference attained automatic qualification for the NCAA Division I Baseball Championship in 1984 and the conference moved its headquarters to Indianapolis. Three changes occurred in the summer of 1985: Oklahoma City dropped out of the NCAA altogether; the name was altered slightly to Midwestern Collegiate Conference; and the conference brought women's athletics into the fold.  The latter triggered Notre Dame's temporary withdrawal from the league as its women's teams were contracted to the North Star Conference. ESPN began televising the MCC Championship game in 1986 and in 1987 Oral Roberts left the conference while Dayton joined and Notre Dame rejoined.  The conference earned its first at-large bid to the men's basketball tournament and automatic qualification to the NCAA Men's Soccer Championship in 1989. The conference won an automatic bid to the NCAA Division I women's basketball tournament in 1991 and the conference lost members Marquette and Saint Louis.  Duquesne and La Salle joined the MCC in 1992, the same year the conference gained an automatic berth to the NCAA Women's Volleyball Championship.  Duquesne and Dayton left the conference in 1993.

Expansion
The largest non-merger conference expansion in NCAA history occurred on December 9, 1993 when Cleveland State, UIC, Northern Illinois, Wisconsin-Green Bay, Wisconsin-Milwaukee, and Wright State left the Mid-Continent to join the Midwestern Collegiate beginning with the 1994–95 academic year. With Evansville's departure to the Missouri Valley Conference, there were 12 league members. Xavier, Notre Dame, and La Salle withdrew the following summer of 1995, followed by Northern Illinois in 1997.  The conference changed its name to the Horizon League on June 4, 2001, in part due to the initials causing confusion between the MCC and the Mid-Continent Conference (who also used the initials).  That year, Youngstown State University came to the Horizon League from the Mid-Con, and on May 17, 2006, Valparaiso University announced it would do the same in 2007.

The split of the original Big East Conference, leading to the formation of the current Big East, had further fallout involving the Horizon League. Loyola announced in April 2013 that it would leave the Horizon League effective July 1 to join the Missouri Valley Conference (MVC), who itself lost Creighton to the reconfigured Big East. The Horizon announced that Oakland University, formerly of The Summit League, would immediately replace Loyola, within a month.

The next change in the Horizon League's membership came in 2015 with the arrival of Northern Kentucky University from the Atlantic Sun Conference (now the ASUN Conference).

Two more membership changes were announced near the end of the 2016–17 school year. First, Valparaiso announced on May 25, 2017, that it would leave for the MVC effective July 1. The Crusaders replaced Wichita State, who announced that it would leave the MVC for the American Athletic Conference. Three days before Valparaiso's departure, the Horizon League Board of Directors unanimously approved the membership of Indiana University – Purdue University Indianapolis (IUPUI) to replace Valparaiso, also effective July 1.

The start of the 2020s set further membership changes into motion, with the arrivals of Purdue Fort Wayne and Robert Morris from the Summit League and the Northeast Conference, respectively, announced on August 5, 2019 and June 15, 2020.  This brought the Horizon League up to 12 full-time members for the first time since the 1994-95 season. It was short-lived, however, as the UIC Flames were reported to be following many of their former conference members to the MVC effective July 1, 2022.

On July 6, 2022, the Horizon League and Ohio Valley Conference (OVC) jointly announced that they would merge their men's tennis leagues under the Horizon banner, effective immediately. The five OVC members that sponsored the sport became Horizon associates. At the same time, the Horizon announced that Belmont, which had just left the OVC for the Missouri Valley Conference (which sponsors tennis only for women), would become a men's tennis associate, and Chicago State, which became a D-I independent after leaving the Western Athletic Conference days earlier, would become an associate in men's and women's tennis.

As of the 2022–23 school year, eight of the 11 full Horizon League members are former members of the Mid-Con (now known as The Summit League), with the exceptions being Detroit Mercy, Northern Kentucky, and Robert Morris.

Basketball success 
The Horizon League is best known for its men's basketball teams and is a marginally well-performing NCAA Division I conferences in that sport according to the NCAA Men's Basketball Rating Percentage Index (RPI). From 2005 to 2011, just seven conferences had wins in every NCAA tournament: the six "power" conferences, and the Horizon League (Milwaukee twice, Cleveland State once, and Butler four times; see Championships and post-season appearances). The Horizon League has been a multi-bid conference nine times, and placed three teams in 1998's March Madness. Multiple Horizon League members have made Sweet 16, Elite Eight and Final Four appearances. In the men's NCAA basketball tournament, the Horizon League currently holds the fifth best winning percentage among non-BCS "Power 6" conferences (21–31, 11th best among the 31 Division I conferences). Over the last 20 years, the Horizon League currently ranks 11th out of 31 NCAA Division I conferences in average RPI season finishes, while having an average finish of 12th (out of 32) over the past ten seasons. In addition, it has also been the launching point of many teams who would later go on to join major or high mid-major conferences; five former members are currently in the Atlantic 10 Conference, and three former members each are in the Missouri Valley Conference and the current Big East Conference.

Horizon League Network
In 2006, the conference launched the Horizon League Network (HLN) as the centerpiece of a revamped web portal.  The digital network aired over 200 live events free on the League's official website at the time.

The Horizon League and WebStream Productions launched a completely redesigned Horizon League Network website in September 2009. The site serves as a portal to hundreds of live and on-demand videos while giving its users the ability to interact on an array of social media platforms.

Horizon League Network migrated to ESPN3 in 2014, and over 700 events streamed live in 2015–16. Its coverage complements events televised on ESPN, ESPN2, ESPNU and members' local sports networks.

Member schools

Current members

Notes

Associate members

Former members
Nicknames and school names reflect those used in the last school year of conference membership.

Notes

Membership timeline

Sponsored sports
The Horizon League sponsors championship competition in nine men's and ten women's NCAA sanctioned sports:

For 2020–21, Detroit Mercy, Wright State and Green Bay announced eliminating men’s and women’s tennis, while Youngstown State reinstated men's swimming & diving.

As noted above, the Horizon League and Ohio Valley Conference merged their men's tennis leagues under the Horizon banner in 2022–23.

Men's sponsored sports by school

Men's varsity sports not sponsored by the Horizon League which are played by Horizon schools:

Women's sponsored sports by school

Women's varsity sports not sponsored by the Horizon League which are played by Horizon schools:

Men's basketball

Horizon League men's basketball tournament champions

Historic
From 1995 to 2011, the Horizon League sent an impressive 24 qualifiers (7 At-Large berths) to the Men's NCAA basketball tournament, making the Horizon League one of the most prolific mid-major (non-power 6) conferences in all of college basketball.  Even more impressively, those 24 clubs produced 22 wins in that span, including five "Sweet 16" appearances, making the Horizon League the only non-BCS conference to have Sweet 16 participants in five NCAA tournaments during that span (2003, 2005, 2007, 2010 and 2011). Four schools from the conference have produced "modern-day" Sweet 16 appearances – Loyola (1985), Xavier (1990), Butler (2003, 2007, 2010 and 2011), and Milwaukee (2005). The Horizon League also compiled a 19–12 record in the NCAA tournament from 2003-2011, ranking tops among all 32 NCAA Division I conferences for winning percentage (.613) in March Madness during that span.  This historic stretch of conference dominance was thanks to NCAA Tournament wins from Butler (15), Milwaukee (3), and Cleveland State (1) . Butler appeared in the men's national championship game in both 2010 and 2011. Since the NCAA began seeding teams in 1979, Loyola's 4 seed in the 1985 tournament is the best for a Horizon League team. The Horizon League currently holds the best winning percentage among non-BCS conferences in the men's NCAA basketball Tournament (.488, 7th overall amongst the 32 Division I conferences).

One former Horizon League member claims a national championship from the era before the league's creation. In the 1963 NCAA Division I men's basketball tournament, Loyola defeated two-time defending champ Cincinnati. Before post-season tournaments determined champions, former Horizon member Butler claimed national titles in 1924 and 1929.

The League hosted the men's Final Four in 1991, 1997, 2000, 2006, 2009 and 2010. It also hosted the women's Final Four in 2005 and 2007.  Horizon League commissioner Jonathan B. LeCrone, who is in his 17th year as league commissioner, just finished a five-year term on the NCAA Division I Men's Basketball Committee.

2000s
As stated on their official website, the recent success of Horizon League athletic teams on the national stage heightened the visibility of the league and its member schools and quickly moved it closer toward its stated goal of becoming one of the nation's top 10 Division I NCAA athletic conferences.

2002–03
In the 2003 NCAA Division I men's basketball tournament, the Horizon League entered two teams for the first time since 1998.  Milwaukee, who earned a 12 seed in its first bid to the tournament since joining the conference, lost by one point to Notre Dame in the first round. Butler, who earned both an at-large bid and a 12 seed, made its fifth tournament appearance in seven years. The Bulldogs made it to the Sweet 16 with victories over No. 20 (5 seed) Mississippi State and No. 14 (4 seed) Louisville before falling to No. 3 (1 seed) Oklahoma in the East Regional. The Bulldogs finished the year ranked No. 21 in the final ESPN/USA Today Top 25 Poll.

2004–05
In the men's 2005 NCAA basketball tournament, the Horizon League enjoyed one of its best showings ever as 12 seed Milwaukee marched to the Sweet 16 with victories over No. 19 (5 seed) Alabama and No. 14 (4 seed) Boston College before they fell to then-No. 1 and eventual tournament runner-up Illinois. Milwaukee ranked as high as No. 23 in the March 7 ESPN/USA Today Top 25 Poll.

2005–06
In the 2006 NCAA basketball tournament, 11 seed Milwaukee once again advanced in the Tournament by upsetting the No. 20 (6 seed) Oklahoma 82–74. The Panthers, led by first year head coach Rob Jeter, fell to eventual national champion No. 11 (AP)/No. 10 (ESPN) (3 seed) Florida in the second round of the tournament. The league had a team advance past the first round for the second straight year and third time in the last four years.

2006–07
In the 2006–07 basketball season, Butler won the Preseason NIT tournament in Madison Square Garden with wins over in-state rivals Notre Dame and Indiana in the NIT's Midwest regional bracket, followed by wins over No. 21 Tennessee and No. 23 Gonzaga in the NIT Final Four in Madison Square Garden. Later, the Bulldogs claimed victory over Purdue in the Wooden Tradition. On February 5, 2007, Butler became the first school in Horizon League history to rank in the Top 10 of the national college basketball polls, as the Bulldogs reached No. 9 and No. 10 in the ESPN/USA Today and AP polls, respectively. The Bulldogs ended their season with a No. 21 ranking in the final AP poll, a 5 seed in the NCAA tournament and a Sweet 16 berth by beating Old Dominion and Maryland before losing to eventual national champion Florida. Wright State also qualified for the NCAA tournament as the winner of the Horizon League tournament championship and tying Butler for the regular season championship. As a 14 seed, the Raiders fell to No. 13 (AP)/No. 11 (ESPN) (3 seed) Pittsburgh in the first round.

2007–08
During the 2007–08 basketball season, Butler won the Great Alaska Shootout with wins over Michigan, Virginia Tech and Texas Tech, and also claimed wins over Ohio State and Florida State, who extended their record against BCS schools to 10–1 since the start of the 2006–07 season.  As a 7 seed in the 2008 NCAA basketball tournament, the Bulldogs beat 10 seed South Alabama before falling in overtime to No. 5 (AP)/No. 4 (ESPN) (2 seed) Tennessee. Butler finished the season ranked No. 11 in the AP poll and No. 14 in the ESPN/USA Today poll. Cleveland State also earned a 6 seed in the NIT, losing in the first round to Dayton.

2008–09
Starting in 2009, regional convenience store and gas station chain Speedway served as the title sponsor of the conference tournament that Cleveland State won and earned the Horizon League's automatic bid to the NCAA Tourney while Butler earned an at-large bid. Butler, a 9 seed, lost in the first round to LSU while 13 seed Cleveland State upset No. 8 (AP)/No. 9 (ESPN) (4 seed) Wake Forest 84–69 (and achieved the third biggest upset in NCAA history winning by 15 points) and shocked the nation in the first round of play before falling to 12 seed Arizona in the second round of tournament play. Butler finished the season ranked No. 22 in the final AP poll and No. 25 in the final ESPN/USA Today poll.

2009–10
After defeating No. 25 (12 seed) UTEP, 13 seed Murray State and No. 4 (1 seed) Syracuse, the No. 8 (ESPN)/No. 11 (AP) (5 seed) Butler men's team defeated No. 7 Kansas State, the 2 seed in the West, by a score of 63–56 to advance to their first Final Four. After beating the No. 12 (ESPN)/No. 13 (AP) (5 seed) Michigan State Spartans 52–50 in the national semifinals, Butler played in Indianapolis against the South Regional Champions, No. 3 (1 seed) Duke for the NCAA Division I National Championship. Butler lost what many call the most thrilling college basketball game in a generation, losing 61–59 in a game that came down to the final play. This is the farthest any team has reached in the tournament while a member of the Horizon League. Butler was the first Division I men's team to play in the Final Four in its hometown since UCLA in 1972, and the first of either sex since Texas played in the 1987 Women's Final Four on its home court.

Also of note, former Milwaukee head coach Bruce Pearl coached the Tennessee Volunteers to the Elite Eight and narrowly lost the opportunity to play Butler by losing to Michigan State, who Butler beat in the Final Four.

2010–11
Butler once again represented the Horizon League in the tournament with another very strong showing. As an 8 seed, Butler defeated (9 seed) Old Dominion, narrowly upset Pittsburgh (who was No. 1 ranked and seeded), Wisconsin (4 seed) and Florida (2 seed) to return to the Final Four. Butler faced VCU, an 11 seed Cinderella team who unexpectedly reached the Final Four as the first team to play five tournament games to reach the Final Four, due to VCU's participation in the inaugural First Four Round. After Butler defeated VCU 70–62, the Bulldogs were in the national championship game for the second consecutive season. This time they faced Connecticut at Reliant Stadium in Houston. The Huskies were too much for the Butler Bulldogs to handle, as Butler lost the game 53–41 in an unusually low-scoring national championship game. This made Butler national runner-up for the second straight season.

2011–12
In the 2012 postseason, the Detroit Titans won their first Horizon League Championship since 1999 under head coach Ray McCallum. They defeated top seeded Valparaiso 70–50. The tournament MVP was son Ray McCallum, Jr.

2012–13
Valparaiso was the regular season champion of the Horizon for the second straight year. It defeated Wright State 62–54 in the championship game under coach Bryce Drew for its first Horizon League Championship. This was the first season that the league was absent of Butler, who departed for the Atlantic 10.

2013–14
Green Bay won the regular season championship in 2014. It was upset by Milwaukee in the tournament semi-final. Milwaukee would go on to win the tournament, knocking off Wright State.

2014–15
Following a good outcome, finishing as the 2014 champions, the Milwaukee Panthers were banned from the 2015 NCAA Tournament and postseason play. Valparaiso won the regular and postseason championships. It entered the NCAA tournament as a 13th seed, although losing in the first round.

2015–16
The 2015 season ushered in the arrival of the Northern Kentucky Norse to the league, who departed from the Atlantic Sun Conference. Valparaiso won the regular season championship again but was defeated by Green Bay in the tournament championship 78–69.

Other sports
The Milwaukee baseball team made national headlines during the 1999 College World Series by upsetting No. 1 ranked Rice in the first round of the NCAA Tournament. In the 2004–05 academic year, Milwaukee's men's soccer team defeated 16th-ranked San Francisco, while Detroit upset Michigan in women's soccer in their respective NCAA tournaments. Also that year, Butler's men's cross country team finished fourth in the nation at the NCAA Cross-Country Championships, and their own Victoria Mitchell became the first Horizon League athlete to win an individual national title when she captured the 3,000 Meter Steeplechase at the NCAA Outdoor Track and Field Championships. Green Bay also upset 6th-ranked Oregon State in the opening round of the NCAA softball tournament.

Although the league does not sponsor football, current members Robert Morris and Youngstown State play in Division I FCS. Youngstown State plays in the Missouri Valley Football Conference; Robert Morris originally planned to play the 2020–21 season as an independent and join Big South Conference football in July 2021, but COVID-19 issues led the Big South to bring Robert Morris into its football league for its rescheduled spring 2021 season. Cleveland State currently does not have a football team but has considered launching a non-scholarship FCS football program in the near future, giving the city of Cleveland its first Division I college football team.  Milwaukee has also examined reviving its football program as recently as 2011.

Facilities

Notes

See also
List of Horizon League champions

References

External links
 

 
Organizations based in Indianapolis
Sports in Indianapolis
Sports organizations established in 1979
Articles which contain graphical timelines
1979 establishments in the United States